Friedlandpreis der Heimkehrer ("Friedland Prize of the Returnees") is an artistic and literary prize of Germany donated by the . It has been awarded annually since 1960. The original prize was 3,000 Deutsche Marks.

Notable recipients 
 1960:  – novel, Die unsichtbare Brücke
 1961:  – sculpture, Denen, die wehrlos sterben ("Those Who Die Defenseless").
 1963: Hans Melchior Brugk – composition, Deutsches Te Deum.
 1965: Hansjörg Kühn "Masken und Menschen"

References 

German literary awards

German art awards